Elections were held in Leeds and Grenville United Counties, Ontario on October 24, 2022 in conjunction with municipal elections across the province.

Leeds and Grenville United Counties Council
The Leeds and Grenville United Counties Council consists of the mayors of the constituent municipalities.

Athens
The following were the results for mayor of Athens.

Augusta
Incumbent mayor Doug Malankar was challenged by deputy mayor Jeff Shaver.

Edwardsburgh/Cardinal
Incumbent mayor Pat Sayeau was challenged by deputy mayor Tory Deschamps.

Elizabethtown-Kitley
The following were the results for mayor of Elizabethtown-Kitley.

Front of Yonge
Roger Haley was re-elected as mayor of Front of Yonge by acclamation.

Leeds and the Thousand Islands
Incumbent mayor Corinna Smith-Gatcke was re-elected by acclamation.

Merrickville-Wolford
Incumbent mayor Doug Struthers was challenged by former deputy mayor Anne Barr and incumbent deputy mayor Michael Cameron.

North Grenville
The following were the results for mayor of North Grenville.

Rideau Lakes
The following were the results for mayor of Rideau Lakes.

Westport
The following were the results for mayor of Westport.

References

Leeds
Leeds and Grenville United Counties